SPRM may refer to:

Science
 Sprm1, a POU domain protein also known as POU5F2
 Selective progesterone receptor modulator
 Supplemental Performance Report Message
 Surface plasmon resonance microscopy

Other
 Malaysian Anti-Corruption Commission (Suruhanjaya Pencegahan Rasuah Malaysia)
 Somali People's Resistance Movement (Al-Shabaab)
 Capitán FAP Leonardo Alvariño Herr Airport (IATA code)